Esbensen is a surname. Notable people with the surname include:

Mogens Bay Esbensen (born 1930), Danish chef and writer
Viktor Esbensen (1881–1942), Norwegian explorer and whaler

See also
Esbensen Bay, a bay of South Georgia